Dag Trygve Truslew Haug (born April 17, 1976) is a Norwegian linguist and associate professor of Latin at the University of Oslo.

Career
Dag Haug attended a French high school before he began studying at the University of Oslo, and he received his master's degree in 1996. He majored in Greek in 1998 and was then a research fellow. In 2001 he received his doctorate with a thesis on the language of the Iliad, and then carried out research until 2003 at the University of Freiburg. Since then he has been at the University of Oslo, first as a postdoctoral fellow, and since 2005 as an associate professor.

Haug's research has focused on classical Greek and Latin. Recently he has also begun to focus more on Indo-European linguistics, studying the relationships between the various Indo-European languages and their history. He is the head of the PROIEL (Pragmatic Resources in Old Indo-European Languages) project at the University of Oslo.

Distinctions
Haug received the Norwegian Royal Gold Medal for young researchers in 2002 for his dissertation, and he won the Nils Klim Prize in 2005.

Publications
 Les phases de l’évolution de la langue épique (Phases in the Evolution of Epic Language, 2001)

References

External links 
 Bibsys: publications by Dag Haug
 
 Homepage at the University of Oslo

Linguists from Norway
Academic staff of the University of Oslo
1976 births
Living people